Poręba Wielka  is a village in the administrative district of Gmina Niedźwiedź, within Limanowa County, Lesser Poland Voivodeship, in southern Poland.

The village has a population of around 2,100, and is a seat of the Gorce National Park.

Polish writer Władysław Orkan was born here.

References

Villages in Limanowa County